Guido Ugolotti (born 28 August 1958) is an Italian professional football  coach and a former player, current coach of the Gozitan team Victoria Hotspurs

Career

Player
Ugolotti was born in Massa. As a player, he spent eight seasons (72 games, 17 goals) in the Serie A with Roma, Avellino and Pisa.

Coach
After serving as youth coach at Roma for 12 years, Ugolotti started a head coaching career of his own at Gela, then going on to stay in Sicily at Acireale. He successively served as head coach at Serie C1 clubs Sambenedettese, Arezzo, Foggia and Siracusa.

In June 2011 he took his first head coaching role in the Serie B, accepting an offer from Grosseto for the 2011–12 season. He was dismissed from his coaching post on 30 October. On 1 February 2012 he was recalled by the same team as head coach, but on 14 May 2012 he was again sacked.

On 15 October 2012, he was named new coach of Benevento, but on 18 January 2013 he was sacked.

On 16 September 2013, he was appointed to replace Ezio Capuano as new boss of Lega Pro Seconda Divisione club Casertana, and guided the club to ensure a spot in the inaugural season of the unified Lega Pro division, leaving his role by the end of the season.

On 28 October 2014, he was named head coach of newly promoted Lega Pro club Savoia in place of Giovanni Bucaro.

After a short spell in Floriana, on 31 December 2019 Ugolotti signed a contract with Victoria Hotspurs until the end of the season.

Honours
 Coppa Italia winner: 1979–80.
 Represented Italy at the 1980 UEFA European Under-21 Football Championship

References

External links

1958 births
Living people
Association football forwards
Italian footballers
Italy under-21 international footballers
Serie A players
Serie B players
A.S. Roma players
U.S. Avellino 1912 players
Pisa S.C. players
S.S. Arezzo players
Italian football managers
A.S. Acireale managers
Benevento Calcio managers
A.S. Sambenedettese managers
S.S. Arezzo managers
Calcio Foggia 1920 managers
F.C. Grosseto S.S.D. managers
Floriana F.C. managers
Maltese Premier League managers